This article lists events that occurred during 1945 in Estonia.

Incumbents

Events
World War II aftermaths: 282,000 dead people (about 1/4 of population of Estonia).
Arrests, nationalization of industry.
Guerilla warfare was intensified. About 15,000 men in underground and in the forests (Forest Brothers).

Births
21 December – Mari Lill, actress

Deaths

References

 
1940s in Estonia
Estonia
Estonia
Years of the 20th century in Estonia